Hrvoje Spahija (born 23 March 1988, in Šibenik) is a Croatian footballer who plays as a defender for NK Vodice.

Club career
A centre-back, Spahija, a native of Šibenik, Croatia, passed through the youth ranks of his hometown club HNK Šibenik. He saw his first senior minutes playing for NK Zagora Unešić on a one-year loan, before returning to Šibenik where he would play for the following four seasons. Mostly a substitute initially, behind more experienced players like Igor Budiša, Velimir Vidić, Marko Kartelo, Tarik Cerić etc., even coming in play positions alien to him, he saw more first team action in his last two seasons in Šibenik, when was then made team captain by the coach Goran Tomić. While Šibenik was relegated after the 2011–2012 season, his games earned him a transfer to the newly promoted Turkish Süper Lig side Elazığspor, where he debuted in a 1–1 draw vs. Fenerbahçe.

Honours

Club
Voluntari
Cupa României: 2016–17

References

External links
 

1988 births
Living people
Sportspeople from Šibenik
Association football central defenders
Croatian footballers
HNK Šibenik players
NK Zagora Unešić players
Elazığspor footballers
NK Olimpija Ljubljana (2005) players
FC Voluntari players
CS Universitatea Craiova players
FC Ordabasy players
Croatian Football League players
Süper Lig players
Slovenian PrvaLiga players
Liga I players
Kazakhstan Premier League players
Croatian expatriate footballers
Croatian expatriate sportspeople in Kazakhstan
Expatriate footballers in Kazakhstan
Croatian expatriate sportspeople in Romania
Expatriate footballers in Romania
Croatian expatriate sportspeople in Slovenia
Expatriate footballers in Slovenia
Croatian expatriate sportspeople in Turkey
Expatriate footballers in Turkey